Barwani district is one of the districts of Madhya Pradesh state of India. The administrative headquarters of the district is at Barwani. Barwani district has an area of 5,427 km² and a population 1,385,881 (2011 census). The district lies in the southwestern corner of Madhya Pradesh; the Narmada River forms its northern boundary. The Satpura Range lies to its south. The district is bordered by Maharashtra state to the south, Gujarat state to the west, Dhar District to the north and Khargone District to the east.

History

In the historical context, Barwani district is described as a rich and fertile land due to Narmada basin. District and its headquarters share the same name. Carved out of Khargone (West-Nimar) district Barwani was formed on 25 May 1998. The excavation carried out by Archaeological survey of India near the village Chikhalda on the bank of Narmada river in between Khaperkheda and Barwani at village Pipri shows the presence of human civilization some five thousand years back, inhabited by the tribals practising shifting cultivation called Jhum.

The name Badwani originated from the forests of Bad (Banyan tree) which had surrounded the city in old times. Wani is the old word for the garden and hence city got its name Badwani which means garden of Bads. Barwani is still pronounced as Badwani but it spells Barwani.

Although the old district west Nimar was ruled by the Satavahanas, Kardamakas, Abhiras, Imperial Gupta, Kalachuris, Vardhana, Chalukyas, Rastrakutas, Pratiharas and the Paramaras; yet there was evidence in the form of copper plate of Subandhu to confirm that the district was under the rule of an independent chief Maharaja Subandhu during the fifth century (468 A.D.). Till 1311 no other evidence found to be determined the dynasty which ruled over the state except the Sisodias of Barwani.The district came under the reigns of Sultans of Malwa almost from the end of 14th century. The fertile valley of Narmada witnessed ups and downs of imperialism. The founder of the Barwani empire was belonging to Guhilot, Suryavanshi dynasty.His forefathers lived in village Sisoda of Rajasthan for quite sometime, so also are called Sisodias. In the 14th century by a Sisodia Prince from Mewar, who migrated into the Narmada Valley, and settled at Avasgarh, a hill in the Satpuras, about 78 kilometres southwest of the present capital. Until 1650, the state was called Avasgadh, after its original capital. The Rana family of Udaipur came in search of livelihoods in the Nimar region and slowly seized the simple tribals on the basis of their subordination. It is said that the Barwani state was established by Dhanak, a warrior who made his kingdom at Awasgarh.

Rana Limbaji of Badwani state was succeeded by his eldest son Rana Chandra Singh in 1640 who founded modern Barwani town. He made Badwani as his capital formerly known as Sidhnagar. Later on the Marathas appeared in the scene of administration from 1703 to 1823. From the beginning of the 18th century the power of the Ranas of Barwani gradually declined; their country, originally of considerable extent and situated between the Narmada and the 11 Tapti, was devastated by the Marathas, and at the time of Malcolm’s settlement of Malwa (1819), only a strip of the Satpura range, 207 kilometres in length, with the lowlands on either side, remained to them. They did not, however, become tributary to any of the Malwa Chiefs.

From 1823 to 1854 Nimar was under the superior control of the Resident at Indore and after 1854, the Agent to the Governor General in central India. Unrest started all over the district during the first 20 years of British utter mismanagement, devolvement of military officers and all.

The district had a record that under the able leadership of Bhima Nayak, one Khajia Naik of Sangir made an attempt to rise against the British in 1857 by cutting telegraph wires, by looting their treasury on the high road and by plundering a few places of Nimar. In October 1858 Tatya Tope, one of the foremost leaders of the Great revolt, crossed the Narmada river and reached Khandwa, but was compelled to escape to central India by way of Khargone in order to escape from the hands of British troops trying to pounce upon him. Khajia Naik, Bhil Chief Bhima and Mawasim joined Tatya Tope at Rajpur. The second fight was fought at Dhaba Baoli, a village in Barwani after which Bhima was caught. Later on, Khajia Naik was also trapped and caught by Major Suntherland with the help of some Makrani detectives and decapitate Barwani state was merged with the Madhya Bharat state after independence in 1948.

Town Barwani was the capital of old Barwani State before 1948. Town Barwani was also known as Badnagar and Siddha Nagar. The place is also famous for Chool Giri, Jain pilgrimage centre of Bawangaja.Barwani has a Historic Symbol which is known as TIR-GOLA. It is located at Khandwa-Baroda Road, in front of Sagar Vilas Palace and was built in the memory of late son of Raja Ranjit Singh.

Economy
In 2006 the Ministry of Panchayati Raj named Barwani one of the country's 250 most backward districts (out of a total of 640). It is one of the 24 districts in Madhya Pradesh currently receiving funds from the Backward Regions Grant Fund Programme (BRGF).

Divisions
The district is divided into two sub-divisions, Barwani and Sendhwa, which are further divided in to nine tahsils, Barwani, Sendhwa, Pansemal, Warla (Varla) Niwali, Thikri, Pati, Anjad and Rajpur, and seven developmental blocks, Barwani, Pati, Sendhawa, Pansemal, Niwali, Thikari and Rajpur. The four Vidhan Sabha constituencies in this district are Pansemal [Pansemal Tehsil+Niwali Tehsil], Barwani [Barwani+Pati], Sendhwa [Sendhwa Tehsil] and Rajpur [Rajpur+Anjad+Thikari+Balsamud]. Barwani, Sendhawa, Pansemal and Rajpur assembly constituencies are part of Khargone Lok Sabha constituency. The district has 417 panchayats and 715 villages, 646 revenue and 69 forest. Out of these villages, 560 are inhabited and 16 are un-inhabited. The two municipalities in this district are Barwani and Sendhawa.

Sendhwa Tehsil is a centre for the cotton ginning industry. Other places of note include:
Anjad, a town that houses the Veereshwar Mahadev, Gayatri Temple and Nagari Mata temple, Balaji temple, Bhairav mandir is the famous religious places of the town along with many cotton factory which gives employee to the thousand of local people. Sanjay Cotton Fiber is the most famous and largest Cotton Factory of the region.
Bawangaja, an important Jain pilgrimage centre lying 6 km from Barwani town. The world's tallest statue of the first Jain Tirthankara Adinatha, is the pride of the town, which also contains as many as eleven 15th-century hindu temples. Kumbhakarna and Indrajeet were said to have attained Nirvana here.
The ancient fort of Bhawar Garh (Borgarh) is located in the Satpuras, 16 km from Sendhawa.
Beejasan is a temple of Goddess Beejasani (Durga), located 20 km south of Sendhawa.
The ancient fort of Ramgarh (Ramgad) is located in the Satpuras, 17 km from Pansemal.
Ancient Bandhareshwar Temple and Jharna (Waterfall) is located in Bandhara Buzurg Village, 8 km from Pansemal.
Jalgone Fort and Tin Taal Bawadi (Well) is located in Jagone Village, 4 km from Pansemal.

Demographics

According to the 2011 census Barwani District has a population of 1,385,881, roughly equal to the nation of Eswatini or the US state of Hawaii. This gives it a ranking of 354th in India (out of a total of 640). Its population growth rate over the decade 2001-2011 was 27.57%. Barwani has a sex ratio of 982 females for every 1000 males, and a literacy rate of 49.08%. Scheduled Castes and Scheduled Tribes make up 6.35% and 69.42% of the population respectively.

Languages

At the time of the 2011 Census of India, 49.58% of the population in the district spoke Bareli, 23.84% Nimadi, 9.71% Hindi, 4.95% Bhilali, 3.75% Bhili, 2.10% Khandeshi, 1.31% Gujarati, 1.26% Marathi and 1.04% Banjari as their first language.

Languages spoken include three mutually unintelligible Bareli languages: Palya, a Bhil language with approximately 10 000 speakers centred in Madhya Pradesh; Pauri, with approximately 175 000 speakers, written in the Devanagari script; and Rathwi, with approximately 64,000 speakers. Other languages include Bhilali, with 11 50 000 speakers.

Notable people 

 Bala Bachchan ( MLA) Rajpur And Home Minister in 2018 State Government of Madhya Pradesh
 Gajendra Singh Patel (MP) Khargone-Barwani
 Ramesh Patel (MLA) Barwani
 Sumer Singh Solanki (MP Rajyasabha) Barwani

Villages 
Bahía Creek
Balkunwa
Pipri Buzurg

References

External links

Barwani district official website

 
Districts of Madhya Pradesh
1998 establishments in Madhya Pradesh